Vescovato (locally ) is a comune (municipality) in the Province of Cremona in the Italian region Lombardy, located about  southeast of Milan and about  northeast of Cremona.

Vescovato borders the following municipalities: Cicognolo, Gadesco-Pieve Delmona, Grontardo, Malagnino, Pescarolo ed Uniti, Pieve San Giacomo, Sospiro.

References

Cities and towns in Lombardy